Lamorna Ash is a British writer and education specialist. Her first book, Dark, Salt, Clear: Life in a Cornish Fishing Town, won the Somerset Maugham Award in 2021.

Biography
Ash attended St Paul's Girls' School and read English at Oxford University, graduating in 2016 with an English Literature degree. She earned an MA in Social and Cultural Anthropology from University College London. She worked as an intern at the Times Literary Supplement

After university, Ash went to Newlyn, a fishing town in Cornwall for one month to learn about their fishing community. She stayed with a local couple, Lofty and Denise, a fishmonger and a ship's chandler. She spent a week on the trawler Filadelfia, working with a crew of local fishermen.

Her first book, Dark, Salt, Clear, written about Ash's time in Newlyn, was published by Bloomsbury in April 2020.  In 2021, 
Ash won the Somerset Maugham Award for her memoir. The book was a BBC Radio 4 'Book of the Week'.
She is currently a freelance writer to The Times Literary Supplement and English specialist for an education charity in Hackney.

References

External links
 Lamorna Ash Podcast interview, Russ Roberts of EconTalk

Living people
People educated at St Paul's Girls' School
Alumni of the University of Oxford
Alumni of University College London
British women writers
British women novelists
Year of birth missing (living people)